Ira John Hesselink Jr. (March 21, 1928 – October 28, 2018) was an American theologian, born Grand Rapids, Michigan, USA.

An expert in John Calvin, he was Albertus C. Van Raalte Professor Emeritus of Systematic Theology at Western Theological Seminary in Holland, Michigan. After his retirement, he was an honorary professor and continued to write a few books on John Calvin and lectures in Europe, South Korea, and Japan. He was a Dutch American theologian who served as a missionary in Japan after receiving theological education at Western Theological Seminary in Holland, Michigan. He wrote a book on Calvin's Catechism and several books and papers. In his contribution to a book on Calvin in the Cambridge Theologian Series, he wrote a paper on Calvin's theology. He was also president of Karl Barth Society of North America founded in October 1972 in Toronto by a group of Canadian and American scholars of Karl Barth, inspired by his son Markus Barth. 

John is survived by the family he loved: Etta, his wife of 67 years; five children and two grandchildren: John III (Nicaragua and Holland, MI), Ann (Del Mar, CA - husband Paul Naour and daughter Katherine Hesselink Hicks), Jud (Martinez, CA), Nathan (Vancouver, BC - wife Serra Hwang and son Braque) and Greg (New York, NY) - all of whom the carry-on his love of knowledge, music and the world at-large.

Selected Bibliography
 
 
 

 Beauty Given by Grace: The Biblical Prints of Sadao Watanabe

References

1928 births
American Calvinist and Reformed theologians
20th-century Calvinist and Reformed theologians
21st-century Calvinist and Reformed theologians
2018 deaths
People from Grand Rapids, Michigan